Discophlebia lipauges is a moth of the family Oenosandridae first described by Alfred Jefferis Turner in 1917. It is found in Australia.

External links
Australian Faunal Directory
CSIRO Entomology

Oenosandridae